The 1950 United States Senate election in South Dakota took place on November 7, 1950. Incumbent Republican Senator Chan Gurney ran for re-election to a third term. He was challenged in the Republican primary by Congressman Francis H. Case, who had represented the 2nd District since 1939. In the general election, Case faced John A. Engel, an attorney and the 1948 Democratic nominee for the U.S. Senate. As the Republican Party was making significant gains nationwide, Case defeated Engel in a landslide.

Democratic Primary

Candidates
 John A. Engel, attorney, 1948 Democratic nominee for the U.S. Senate
 John S. Tschetter, Mayor of Huron

Results

Republican Primary

Candidates
 Francis H. Case, U.S. Congressman from South Dakota's 2nd congressional district
 Chan Gurney, incumbent U.S. Senator

Results

General election

Results

References

South Dakota
1950
1950 South Dakota elections